The 2006 Pulitzer Prizes were announced on April 17, 2006.

The board announced in December 2005, that they will consider more online material in all 14 journalism categories.

For the first time since 1997, the Pulitzer board declined to award a Pulitzer Prize for Drama.

Journalism

Letters and Drama

Special Citations
 Edmund S. Morgan, a Special Citation to Edmund S. Morgan for a creative and deeply influential body of work as an American historian that spans the last half century.
 Thelonious Monk, a posthumous Special Citation to American composer Thelonious Monk for a body of distinguished and innovative musical composition that has had a significant and enduring impact on the evolution of jazz.

References

External links
 
 "2006 Pulitzer Prizes for Journalism". The New York Times.
 "Pulitzer Prizes for Letters and Music". The New York Times.

Pulitzer Prizes by year
Pulitzer Prize
Pulitzer Prize
Pulitzer Prize, 2006